Lova Inger Irene Drevstam (born 4 November 1992), known as Lovad, is a Swedish singer and songwriter.

Career
Under the stage name, Lova, she released her debut single "Min syster sa" in 2018. In 2019, Lovad was named as one of the Stockholms Topp 5 by Sveriges Radio. She was also awarded a music and songwriting scholarship in STIM.

In 2020, she released a single with Albin Johnsén titled "Vi gjorde vårt bästa". On 1 December 2020, Lovad announced that she would participate in Melodifestivalen 2021 with the song "Allting är precis likadant", co-written by her, along with Johnsén, Mattias Andréasson and Alexander Nivek. Her song, "Allting är precis likadant", failed to qualify from the semi-finals and was eliminated.

Discography

Singles

References

Living people
1992 births
People from Tyresö Municipality
21st-century Swedish singers
21st-century Swedish women singers
Melodifestivalen contestants of 2021